Mobify, a Salesforce company, offers a Front-end as a Service. Headquartered in Vancouver, British Columbia, Canada, the technology company has a network of customers and partners worldwide.

Acquisitions 
Salesforce, the global leader in customer relationship management (CRM), acquired Mobify in September, 2020.

Company history
The company was co-founded in 2007 by Igor Faletski, John Boxall & PJ McLachlan. Igor Faletski met his future co-founder, John Boxall, while attending Simon Fraser University in Vancouver, British Columbia, Canada. After continuously missing their bus during their final year of school, the pair saw an opportunity to address this common problem using mobile devices. PJ joined the founding team when John & Igor discovered PJ's transWidget project, a Mac OS X dashboard widget for displaying upcoming bus times from TransLink.  They developed a system to deliver bus schedules to their mobile devices through SMS text messaging. Local media buzz around the service motivated them to start their own company in Igor’s mother’s basement and license the system to TransLink.

Further business development efforts showed that the product wasn’t scalable, so they changed directions and started developing a new system to help enterprise websites build adaptive mobile websites.

In 2013, Mobify had 90,000 users in more than 200 countries, including Starbucks, Bosch, and Toyota. In early 2015, Google announced the support of Progressive Web Applications (PWAs), and Mobify launched their first PWA with PureFormulas. A PWA allows mobile websites to behave like a native apps with ‘add to home screen’ prompts, offline support, and increased pagespeed. Mobify then saw a gap in the ecommerce market and realized digital excellence should not be limited to mobile, but available on any device the customer chooses to use. After already working with British multinational retailer Debenhams to power their PWA, Mobify launched their first desktop PWA. This opened the door to their current product, their Front-end Platform as a Service for a headless commerce architectures. In 2020, Mobify was acquired by Salesforce.

Corporate culture
In September of 2020, Salesforce signed a definitive agreement to acquire Mobify. 

As of June 2019, Mobify has a 4.2 star rating on Glassdoor.com (up from a 4.1 star rating in January 2018). Employees enjoy perks such as health and dental, a device budget, fitness classes, a stocked kitchen, team events, and office games.

In 2014, Businessweek highlighted Mobify as a tech anchor in Vancouver.

References

Technology companies of Canada
Salesforce